Patrick Iannone is a Canadian-born Italian former professional ice hockey player who participated at the 2010 IIHF World Championship as a member of the Italian National men's ice hockey team.

Career statistics

References

1982 births
Living people
Asiago Hockey 1935 players
Canadian expatriate ice hockey players in the United States
HC Varese players
Ice hockey people from British Columbia
Italian ice hockey forwards
Kootenay Ice players
Medicine Hat Tigers players
Tri-City Americans players
Regina Pats players